The Coalsack Nebula (Southern Coalsack, or simply the Coalsack) is a dark nebula, which is visible to the naked eye as a dark patch obscuring part of the Milky Way east of Acrux (Alpha Crucis) in the constellation of Crux.

General information
Historically any other dark cloud in the night sky was called coalsack. The Coalsack Nebula was juxtaposed in 1899 by Richard Hinckley Allen through naming the Northern Coalsack Nebula.

The Coalsack Nebula covers nearly 7° by 5° and extends into the neighboring constellations Centaurus and Musca. The first observation was reported by Vicente Yáñez Pinzón in 1499. It was named "il Canopo fosco" (the dark Canopus) by Amerigo Vespucci and was also called "Macula Magellani" (Magellan's Spot) or "Black Magellanic Cloud" in opposition to the Magellanic Clouds.

In Australian Aboriginal astronomy, the Coalsack forms the head of the emu in the sky in several Aboriginal cultures. Amongst the Wardaman people, it is said to be the head and shoulders of a law-man watching the people to ensure they do not break traditional law. According to a legend reported by W. E. Harney, this being is called Utdjungon and only adherence to the tribal law by surviving tribe members could prevent him from destroying the world with a fiery star. There is also a reference by Gaiarbau (1880) regarding the coalsacks replicating bora rings on Earth. These astronomical sites allowed the spirits to continue ceremony similar to their human counterparts on Earth. As bora grounds are generally located on the compass points north–south, the southern coal sack indicates the ceremonial ring.

In Inca astronomy this nebula was called Yutu, after a partridge-like South American bird, or Tinamou.

References

External links

 Starry Night Photography: Coalsack Dark Nebula
 Starry Night Photography: The Emu
 SIMBAD: Coalsack Nebula

Crux (constellation)
Dark nebulae
099b